Finocchio's Club was a former nightclub and bar in operation from 1936 to 1999 in North Beach, San Francisco, California. The club started as a speakeasy called the 201 Club in 1929, located at 406 Stockton Street. In 1933, with the repeal of prohibition, the club moved upstairs and started to offer female impersonation acts; after police raids in 1936 the club relocated to the larger 506 Broadway location. Finocchio's night club opened June 15, 1936 and was located in San Francisco, California, above Enrico's Cafe at 506 Broadway Street in North Beach.

Name 
The term finocchio is Italian for fennel, but is often a negative term for homosexual. Finocchio are described as young male prostitutes, often underage, working at brothels. In New York City, the Italian word finocchio was common derogatory slang for homosexual men, equivalent to fairy or faggot.

History 
Joseph "Joe" Finocchio, the creator of the club, had the idea of a nightclub with female impersonators in costumes when a patron jokingly went on the stage of his club and did a routine that the crowd enjoyed. The club was not advertised as a gay club; it was advertised as a place for entertainment and fun. Both gay and straight performers worked there. The acts included varying ethnic-inspired performances such as geisha-style performances, which may have helped encourage tourists and contributed to the diverse, often racially diverse crowds, which was unusual during this time of segregation. In the days before gay liberation, female impersonator clubs provided semi-public social spaces for sexual minorities to congregate.

Finocchio's often featured traditional drag, with performers in gowns singing or lip-synching to top 40 ballads.

Finocchio's was "off limits" during World War II, not due to the entertainment, but rather for selling liquor to the military outside the authorized hours of sales. On December 31, 1943 the ban was lifted after Joe Finocchio and other bar owners signed an agreement to limit liquor sales to military personnel between 5 pm and midnight.

Finocchio's was a huge favorite with tourists from the 1930s to the early 1990s. Joe Finocchio died in January 1986. Eve Finocchio, Joe's widow, decided to close the club on November 27, 1999 because of a significant increase in the monthly rent and dwindling audience attendance.

Some other notable female impersonators acts and nightclubs of the era include The Beige Room in San Francisco; Club 82 in New York City; and the traveling Jewel Box Revue.

Sex work 
Finocchio's nightclub combined entertainment with sex trade and prostitution. With the criminalization of prostitution, there was a general trend away from commercial brothels and towards nightclubs. While some nightclubs had rooms rented by the hour, Finocchio's did not have these.

In 1936, Finocchio's nightclub was subjected to a police raid. Five female impersonators were arrested, along with the owners of the club. The owners were arrested for employing entertainers on a percentage basis. This was reputed to lead to entertainers mingling with male customers, trading attention and sexual favors for drinks at an inflated price. Following the police raid, the owners moved Finocchio's to a different location, hired more entertainers, and stopped employing the entertainers on a percentage basis. Following the police raid on Finocchio's, the 201 Club had its dance permit revoked for employing female impersonators on a percentage basis. The entertainers were known to mingle with guests, soliciting drinks.

In the 1950's, Dr. Harry Benjamin began administering estrogen-based hormone replacement therapy to prospective transsexuals in San Francisco. He relayed information about the sex work infrastructure for female impersonators at Finocchio's nightclub in the 1950's:

Friedman writes that this method of arranging "dates" had precedent in the "messenger boy" culture of New York City and Chicago in the 1950's. Rates of $20-50 were at least twice as expensive as rates by cross-dressing street prostitutes during that same era. In 1972, an article in Lee Brewster's Drag magazine mentions the practical aspects of prostitution found there, and $50 for sex with an attractive female impersonator:

Influence 
A 14-page program, "Finocchio's: America's Most Unusual Nightclub", was published by Zevin-Present, circa 1947. The Finocchio shows published playbills. After Finocchio's closed, they donated the costumes, photos and programs to the GLBT Historical Society.

It is thought that Finocchio’s was the catalyst for the art of drag. Celebrities who attended shows at Finocchio’s throughout their many years of operation included Frank Sinatra, Howard Hughes, Ava Gardner, Tallulah Bankhead, David Niven, Errol Flynn, Judy Garland, Marilyn Monroe, Bette Davis, Marlene Dietrich, Lena Horne, Joan Crawford, Barbra Streisand, Mae West, Carol Channing, William Haines, Elizabeth Taylor, Montgomery Clift, Roddy McDowall, Liza Minnelli, Cher and Bette Midler among others.

After the closure, another San Francisco establishment called Harry Denton's Starlight Room started a drag show in 2006 called "Sunday's a Drag," a female impersonation show modeled after Finocchio's. These shows are hosted by Donna Sachet.

Notable acts
Artists who performed at Finocchio's included (in alphabetical order):
   
 David de Alba, often dressed as Judy Garland or Liza Minnelli.
 Angel Amor
 Vaughn Auldon
 Jim Bailey, performed at Finocchio's in the 1970s.
 Kenny Bee (also known as Kenneth Bachelor)
 Bobby Belle
 Francis Blair
 Ray Bourbon
 Aleshia Brevard, her Marilyn Monroe impression became so well known that Marilyn Monroe came to see her perform.
Lenny Bruce, comedian
 LaVern Cummings
 Francis David
 Val DeVere
 Frank Doran
 Ray Francis
 Nicki Gallucci
 Candi Guerrero
 William Hart
 Tex Hendrix
 Sir Lady Java
 Bobby Johnson
 Pussy Katt
 Brian Keith
 Bambi Lake
 Milton LaMaire 
 Lestra La Mont
 Jeri-Lane
 Paul La Ray 
 Harvey Lee (also known as Harvey Wilson Goodwin)
 Del LeRoy
 Li-Kar, performed a "Geisha dance" and was also a designer and artist, contributing visuals to the Finocchio's playbill.
 John Lonas
 Johnny Mangum
 Katherine Marlow 
 Niles Marsh
 Jackie Maye
 Kelly Michaels, as Madonna in the late 1980s.
 Mike Michelle
 Karyl Norman, worked at Finocchino's circa the 1930s, a former well-known vaudeville performer.
 Lucian Phelps ("a Sophie Tucker expert", or "Male Sophie Tucker") would wear Sophie Tucker's actual gowns and early in their career performed vaudeville.
 Jackie Philips
 Charles Pierce      
 Russell Reed
 Freddie Renault
 Libby Reynolds
 Craig Russell
 Lori Shannon 
 Nikki Starr
 Francis Stillman
 William Stoffler 
 Holotta Tymes
 Carroll Wallace 
 Holly White

See also 
 Pansy Craze, prohibition-era popularization of drag queens within the LGBTQ community
 Club 82 – New York City, nightclub (1926–1973) featuring female impersonators 
 Club My-O-My – New Orleans nightclub (1933–1936) featuring female impersonators.
 Black Cat Bar –  a former queer bar in San Francisco (open 1906–1921; re-opened 1933–1964).

References

External links 

 Video from Finocchio's Club (November 24, 1943) featuring Michael Callahan and Forgotten Day
Video featuring Finocchio's Club and an interview with LaVerne Cummings from the television show "On The Town" (circa 1980) with Connie Chung
Various Finocchio's publications in the Digital Transgender Archive

North Beach, San Francisco
Nightclubs in San Francisco
LGBT history in San Francisco
Defunct LGBT nightclubs in California
Speakeasies
1936 establishments in California
1999 disestablishments in California
1930s in LGBT history